Christian Coleman (born 31 August 1998) is a Welsh rugby union player who plays for the Dragons as a prop.

Coleman made his debut for the Dragons in 2016 having previously played for the Dragons academy, Cross Keys RFC, Newport RFC and Garndiffaith RFC.

References

External links 
Dragons profile
itsrugby.co.uk profile

Welsh rugby union players
Rugby union props
Dragons RFC players
Rugby union players from Newport, Wales
Living people
1998 births